Cho Yeo-jeong (born February 10, 1981) is a South Korean actress. She is best known internationally for her role in the film Parasite (2019), which won four Academy Awards and became the first non-English language film to win the award for Best Picture.

Cho is also known for her roles in the films The Servant (2010), The Concubine (2012), and Obsessed (2014), as well as the television series I Need Romance (2011), Lovers of Haeundae (2012), Divorce Lawyer in Love (2015), Woman of 9.9 Billion (2019–2020), and Cheat on Me If You Can (2020–2021).

Life and career
Cho Yeo-jeong was born in Seoul, South Korea. She debuted as a CeCi Magazine cover girl at the age of 16 in 1997, and began actively acting in 1999. Despite appearing in drama series, music videos, and TV commercials afterwards, she remained obscure. During this period, she was also unhappy with the limited roles being offered to her.

Then Cho rose to the spotlight in 2010 by starring as the ambitious Joseon woman of lower class in the erotic period drama The Servant. The R-rated movie, which was a newly adapted and tragic version of Korea's famous folktale The Story of Chunhyang, had been turned down by a number of actresses because it contained too many sex scenes. Cho, however, took advantage of the opportunity and it turned out to be a huge stepping stone in her career. Upon the release of the film, Cho successfully escaped being "another pretty face" in Korea's entertainment scene.

In 2011, Cho starred in hit cable series I Need Romance, a sexually frank and funny comedy about a group of single thirty-something girlfriends navigating the dating scene in Seoul, which boasted stylish and slick production values.

Few would have expected her to star in another period drama that required full nudity, as doing so may have stigmatized her in Korea's film industry. Despite the collective concerns expressed by local media that she was "going nude too often," in 2012 the actress chose another period thriller with explicit sex scenes. She had admired the work of director Kim Dae-seung and wanted to work with him, so after reading his latest script, she pursued being cast as the complex titular character of The Concubine. Despite the hype, the film was critically praised. In an interview for the film, Cho said that most of all, she wants to be seen as an adventurous and intriguing actress.

In the 2012 romantic comedy series Haeundae Lovers, Cho played the bright and cheerful daughter of a Busan gangster, who falls in love with the amnesiac undercover prosecutor living with them. A year later, Cho's book Healing Beauty was published, containing tips and advice on health and beauty, based on the know-how she's amassed as an actress over her 16-year career.

In 2013, Cho became involved in a publicized contract dispute when she signed a new contract with Bom Entertainment while her contract with Didim531 was still in effect. The Korea Entertainment Management Association suggested that Cho avoid working with both agencies, and she joined Neos Entertainment in 2014.

Cho starred in two movies in 2014. She reunited with director Kim Dae-woo (The Servant) in another erotic period film, this time set during the Vietnam War, titled Obsessed. She also played an abducted wife in The Target, a remake of French action-thriller Point Blank.

In 2015, Cho starred in the sex comedy Casa Amor: Exclusive for Ladies, which she said made her realize "how gratifying it is to see people laughing because of me." She said further, "Casa Amor: Exclusive for Ladies is the first film I've done in a long time whose story focuses on women. I hope that, building on the success of this film, more films featuring women's voices and experiences are made."

Cho started in her first television series of 2020, Cheat on Me If You Can since Woman of 9.9 Billion in 2019.

Filmography

Film

Television series

Variety show

Music video

Ambassadorship

Musical theatre

Discography

Book

Awards and nominations

Listicles

References

External links 

 (as Yeo-jeong Jo)

21st-century South Korean actresses
South Korean film actresses
South Korean television actresses
South Korean musical theatre actresses
South Korean female models
1981 births
Living people
Dongguk University alumni
L&Holdings artists
Models from Seoul
Outstanding Performance by a Cast in a Motion Picture Screen Actors Guild Award winners